Events from the year 1849 in Ireland.

Events
 30–31 March – Doolough Tragedy: at least 16 die when hundreds of the destitute and starving are forced to make a fatiguing journey on foot to receive outdoor relief in County Mayo.
 21 April – Great Famine: 96 inmates of the overcrowded Ballinrobe Union Workhouse have died over the course of the preceding week from illness and other famine-related conditions, a record high. This year's potato crop again fails and there are renewed outbreaks of cholera.
 12 July – Dolly's Brae conflict: Up to 1,400 armed Orangemen march from Rathfriland to Tollymore Park near Castlewellan, County Down. When 1000 armed Ribbonmen gather, shots are fired, Catholic homes are burnt and about eighty Catholics killed.
 16 July – Donaghadee to Portpatrick packet service withdrawn.
 2–12 August – visit of Queen Victoria to Cork, Dublin and Belfast, landing on 3 August at Cove, which is renamed Queenstown in her honour, and departing from Kingstown. She officially opens Queen's Bridge in Belfast.
 18 October – Great Southern and Western Railway opens to Cork.
 Construction begins on the 18-arch Craigmore Viaduct near Newry, on the Dublin-Belfast railway line (opened in 1852).
 George Boole appointed as first professor of mathematics at Queen's College, Cork.
 William Thompson begins publication (in London) of The Natural History of Ireland with the first volume on birds.

Births
31 January – Robert James McMordie, solicitor, politician and Lord Mayor of Belfast (died 1914).
12 February – John Edward Robinson, Missionary Bishop of the Methodist Episcopal Church (died 1922).
18 May – John Clark, boxer (died 1922).
9 July – Robert McCall, lawyer (died 1934).
1 August – William Larminie, poet and folklorist (died 1900).
16 August – James Buchanan, 1st Baron Woolavington, businessman and philanthropist (died 1935).
24 October – Nugent Everard, soldier, Seanad member (died 1929).
19 November – James Mason, chess player and writer (died 1905).
12 December – Peter F. Collier, publisher (died 1909 in the United States)
Charles James O'Donnell, colonial administrator and MP (died 1934).

Deaths
21 January – Anthony Manahan, businessman and politician in Upper Canada (born 1794).
26 January – Thomas Arbuthnot, British military officer (born 1776).
7 March – Maurice FitzGerald, 18th Knight of Kerry, Whig politician (born 1774).
27 March – Archibald Acheson, 2nd Earl of Gosford, MP, Lieutenant-Governor of Lower Canada and Governor General of British North America (born 1776).
22 May – Maria Edgeworth, novelist (born 1767).
28 May – Joseph Blake, 3rd Baron Wallscourt, socialist (born 1797).
20 June – James Clarence Mangan, poet (born 1803) (cholera).
September – Daniel Robertson, architect and garden designer (born c. 1770 in British North America).
27 December – James Fintan Lalor, revolutionary, journalist and writer (born 1807).

References

 
1840s in Ireland
Ireland
Years of the 19th century in Ireland
 Ireland